HMS Courageous or Courageux (the French spelling) may refer to one of several ships of the Royal Navy:

 , a 74-gun ship of the line captured from the French on 13 August 1761, and wrecked on the coast of Morocco 19 Dec 1796.
 HMS Courageux, or Courageuse, was a 32-gun sailing frigate captured from the French in June 1799. She was renamed 'Lutine' in November 1799 and used as a prison ship at Gibraltar. Sold in April 1802 and broken up in Malta.
 , a 74-gun third rate launched in 1800, laid up in 1814, and later in use as a lazaretto. Broken up 1832.
 , a Churchill-class nuclear powered fleet submarine in service from 1971 to 1993, and presently on display at Plymouth.

Battle honours
Ships named Courageous have earned the following battle honours:
Falkland Islands, 1982

Royal Navy ship names